The Scottish Place-Name Society (Comann Ainmean-Áite na h-Alba in Gaelic) is a learned society in Scotland concerned with toponymy, the study of place-names. Its scholars aim to explain the origin and history of the place-names they study, taking into account the meaning of the elements out of which they were created; the topography, geology and ecology of the places bearing the names; and the general and local history and culture of Scotland.

The Society was founded in February 1996. The Society's journal, The Journal of Scottish Name Studies (JSNS), has been published since 2007.

See also
Ainmean-Àite na h-Alba
International Council for Onomastic Studies
English Place-Name Society
Ulster Place-Name Society
Society for Name Studies in Britain and Ireland
Scottish Society for Northern Studies

Further reading
 Watson, W.J., History of the Celtic Place-Names of Scotland. Reprinted,  with introduction, full bibliography and corrigenda by Simon Taylor. Edinburgh: Birlinn, 2004.
 Nicolaisen, W.F.H., Scottish Place-Names. Edinburgh: Edinburgh U.P., 2001.

External links
Official website
Publisher's website for the JSNS

1996 establishments in Scotland
Archaeological organizations
Archaeology of Scotland
Learned societies of Scotland
 
Organizations established in 1996
Scottish studies